Ruan-Henry Smith (born 24 January 1990) is a South African professional rugby union player currently signed to the New South Wales Waratahs of Super Rugby in Australia for Super Rugby Pacific. His regular playing position is Loosehead Prop.

Smith previously played for the Melbourne Rebels team in Super Rugby. Smith is the twin brother of JP Smith (rugby union) who is also a professional rugby player.

Rugby career
Smith made his Super Rugby debut for the  during the 2012 Super Rugby season.

Smith went to Japan after 2013 Super Rugby season where he played three seasons with Toyota Verblitz. He initially signed with the Tokyo-based Sunwolves for the 2018 Super Rugby season but, after his mother fell ill, he was released on compassionate grounds and returned to his home in Brisbane where he joined his twin brother Jean-Pierre at the Queensland Reds.

In 2020, Smith signed to his fourth Super Rugby club with the Melbourne Rebels, and after a stint with the LA Giltinis in 2021, Smith was announced in October 2021 as a new signing for the NSW Waratahs for the upcoming 2022 season.

Super Rugby statistics

References

External links

Rugby union props
1990 births
Living people
Western Force players
ACT Brumbies players
Canberra Vikings players
Western Province (rugby union) players
South African rugby union players
People from Vryburg
Alumni of Paarl Gimnasium
South African expatriate rugby union players
Expatriate rugby union players in Australia
South African expatriate sportspeople in Australia
Toyota Verblitz players
South African expatriate sportspeople in Japan
Expatriate rugby union players in Japan
Queensland Reds players
Melbourne Rebels players
Brisbane City (rugby union) players
Expatriate rugby union players in the United States
LA Giltinis players
New South Wales Waratahs players
Rugby union players from North West (South African province)
Lions (United Rugby Championship) players
Golden Lions players